The Climber is a 1966 Yugoslav drama film directed by Vladan Slijepčević. It was entered into the 5th Moscow International Film Festival where it won a Silver Prize.

Cast
 Ljubiša Samardžić as Ivan Stojanovic
 Špela Rozin as Bozica
 Stanislava Pesić as Dragana
 Rade Marković as Vojin
 Duša Počkaj as Kaca Radak
 Ljubinka Bobić as Gazdarica
 Jovisa Vojinović as Gazda Sveta
 Mihajlo Kostić Pljaka as Janketa
 Dragomir 'Gidra' Bojanić as Jakov Stipetic
 Božidar Stošić as Mali
 Predrag Tasovac as Direktor televizije
 Belle Marquez as The Climber 1
 Rosse Celle Marquez as The Climber 2

References

External links
 

1966 films
1966 drama films
Serbian-language films
Serbian drama films
Serbian black-and-white films
Yugoslav black-and-white films
Yugoslav drama films
Films set in Yugoslavia